Syed Qasim Mahmood (Urdu: 17 November 1928 – 31 March 2010) was a Pakistani intellectual and Urdu short story writer, novelist, editor, publisher, translator, and encyclopedist.

He compiled fifteen encyclopedias and one dictionary and left seven encyclopedias uncompleted, produced three collections of short stories, wrote one novel, one novelette, and five dramas for Radio Pakistan, wrote story of one film, Bagi Sipahi (Rebel Soldier), translated works of international fiction, science & technology, edited nine literary and social magazines, and brought forth nine scientific and literary magazines.

From his publishing companies, he published 211 scientific and literary books, wrote many articles on literature, science, politics and sociology in national newspapers and magazines.

Early life
Syed Qasim Ali Shah was born in Kharkhoda, a town in Sonipat district, British India. His father, Syed Hashim Ali Shah, was a landlord. Syed Hashim's father left behind many acres of land, but he could not manage this property, so he sold some land every year to bear his home & family expanses. Syed Hashim was illiterate man and didn't like the new western education that Sir Syed Ahmed Khan, famous Muslim reformer of India, wanted to give to young Muslims. He called it Kufr (Disbelief). But Qasim's Mother, Firdausi Begum, wanted to educate his beloved eldest son in school after madrasa education.

She not only faced husband's oppression but also sold her only gold bangle, so with enough money Qasim obtained admission in the town's school. Qasim also didn't disappoint mother and in 1940, stood first in primary school examination in the Punjab province. He got 40 marks out of 40. Then the Chief Minister of Punjab, Sir Sikandar Hayat Khan (Punjabi politician) came to Kharkhoda to give Qasim a reward. Qasim became the first Muslim child in Punjab who stood first in primary examination. In 1947 in matriculation exam from Punjab University and he stood first in Ambala division of Punjab Province.

Qasim also took part in Pakistan movement. He was a joint secretary of Kharkhoda Primary Muslim league. Qasim's mother family lived in Delhi. During summer holidays, all children had a good time in Indian capital. In 1946, after matriculation exam, Qasim got a job in Hamdard Dawakhana, Delhi, and worked with well-known intellectual Hakim Said for some months.

In 1947 Indians Muslims got a new country, Pakistan, and millions of Indian Muslims embarked on migration to Pakistan. Qasim also reached Lahore by Train. When Qasim reached Lahore, his pocket was empty and he was alone. But he knew that God help those who help themselves.

A new beginning
He started doing small jobs to earn money. He sold newspaper in the bazaar, took a job of peon, became a wood cutter and then a telephone lineman. At last, he got a permanent job in the famous Urdu national daily, Zamindar as a jack of all trades. Because Qasim naturally liked writing and literary activity, he developed intimacy with great Urdu writers and journalists, e.g. Maulana Zafar Ali Khan, Maulana Azar Amritsari, Haji Laqlaq, Maulana Murtaza Ahmad Khan Maikash and Maulana Abu Saeed Buzmi extra. He intellectually benefited from them greatly.

The same year, 1948, he began working at the monthly Alamgir as a manager. Alamgir was a famous literary magazine in those days, with Hafiz Mohammad Alam its proprietor and editor. There Qasim build friendship with noted writers including Mirza Adeeb and Sheikh Mohammed Ismail Panipati. In 1949 he worked in weekly Khiam and he also worked at Publishers United, a famous publishing company, from 1951 to 1960.

In January 1950 Qasim went to Punjab University, Lahore, to receive his matriculation certificate. In the office he met the assistant registrar, Mohammed Afzal, who was impressed by Qasim's education. Mr. Afzal gave Qasim a high-paying clerical job in University. (In General Muhammad Zia-ul-Haq's government, Dr. Mohammed Afzal was Minister of Education). In Punjab University Qasim became very active in promoting Urdu as a national language of Pakistan.

After some months Qasim set up the Urdu League organization. From this platform, he promoted the idea that university office work must be done in Urdu. He thought that the national Language Urdu should be the base for educational, political and economic progress and prosperity. In Punjab University administration, some were against Urdu and vigorously opposed Qasim. He wrote articles and pamphlets against them in the pen name of Qasim Mahmood, so he couldn't be traced; otherwise he could have lost his job.

Many well-known people of Urdu literature, e.g. Maulana Salahuddin Ahmed, Dr. M. D. Taseer, Justice S. A. Rahman, and Taj Mohammed Khaial, become his supporters. At last syndicate of Punjab University approved that office work will be done in Urdu. From August 1950, University starts publishing Science and Mashiat (Economics). These were monthly magazines of Maulvi Abdul Haq's organization, Anjuman Taraqqi-i-Urdu, which had a head office in Karachi. In Lahore both magazines were published by Punjab University, by agreement with Anjuman. The arrangement was that the University would bear expanses of paper, press, binding, etc.

In university, the management work of these magazines was done by Qasim Mahmood. He also read proofs of articles. So he started correspondence with Baba-e-Urdu, Maulvi Abdul Haq. He also wrote some articles in Mashiat. That's why, Baba-e-Urdu believed that Qasim is professor in Punjab University, although he was just a clerk.

In December 1950 Punjab University started a huge project, Urdu Da'ira Ma'arif-i-Islamiya (Urdu  Encyclopaedia of Islam). Basically this was translation of Encyclopedia  of Islam, a project of Leiden University. Its editor in chief was famous Persian and Urdu scholar, Professor Dr. Muhammad Shafi. Now Qasim become his assistant for office work and other duties. And after becoming researcher, he also wrote articles for Da'ira Ma'arif-i-Islamiya.

In those days, Qasim worked 5 to 9 daily, so he could earn enough money for home expanses. He was also news editor of newspaper Khwateen (women) for some months. This was first Urdu newspaper exclusively for Pakistani women. It was published by Paisa Akhbar, a publishing firm founded by famous Urdu editor, journalist and writer, Maulana Mahboob Alam.

1951 to 1960
In October 1951, the Punjab government formed an organization, Majlis-Zaban-i-Daftri (Official Language Committee), so English terms used in official works can translated to Urdu. Only MA candidates are wanted to do this job. Accidentally, Qasim is doing same job, i.e. translation of English terms in Urdu, for about one year in his capacity. He sent some of his translation matter to Majlis-Zaban-i-Daftri secretary, Hakim Ahmed Shuja. Hakim Sahib was noted Urdu dramatist and also Speaker of Punjab Assembly. He sent job examination forms also to Qasim Mahmood.

Although Qasim is only matriculate, he stood first in examination, among 66 candidates. Because his education standard was below requirements, Hakim Ahmed Shuja sent his special case to Governor Punjab and renowned Pakistan movement politician, Sardar Abdur Rab Nishtar. On 18 August 1951 Qasim met with Nishtar Sahib. He gave permission to include Qasim in Majlis. He also gives him three yearly increments and said to Qasim: "You are young and energetic youth. In Urdu we have many romantic stories and tales, but books on science and technology are very rare. So work on these books." It's the first time that young Qasim heard the name of Encyclopedia.

Qasim quit his university job and become member of official language committee. In Majlis-Zaban-i-Daftri Qasim got blessing of distinguished legendary literary men Justice S. A. Rahman, Professor Mahmood Ahmed Khan, Professor Taj Mohammed Khial, Maulana Salahuddin Ahmed and Dr. Syed Abdullah. Qasim also start attending sittings of famous Urdu literacy circle, Halqa-e Arbab-e Zauq. He was also regular attendee of Anjuman Tarraqi Pasand Mussanafin, Pakistan (Progressive Writers' Movement) and Halqa Arbab Ilm. Halqa Arbab Ilm was founded by Khawaja Dil Muhammad and Aga Bedar Bakht. Both ware famous intellectuals of their time.

In 1952, Qasim translated his first novel, Guy de Maupassant's great work, Une vie. In Urdu novel name is Aik Dil (one's heart). One day Qasim contact Saadat Hasan Manto, perhaps the Urdu greatest short story writer, so he can write forward of Aik Dil. At that time Manto Sahib was intoxicated. He read some lines of novel and then said in irrational tone to Qasim "You never become writer, you can't write a word." Then he threw away the novel. When Qasim come out from Manto's house, tears in his eyes, he vowed to himself "Soon Manto Sahib will see, I will become the leading writer of Pakistan."

Qasim left his lucrative Majlis job and start reading short stories in Halqa Arbab Zauq meetings. He got praise from writers and public as well. In coming years he remain joint sectary of Halqa till 1972 and took active part to organize literary meetings. Pak Tea House was center of literary gatherings. Poets, Qayyum Nazar, Nasir Kazmi, Shurat Bukhari, Amjad Altaf and short story writers, Ijaz Hussain Batalv, Intizar Hussain and Ashfaq Ahmed are his good friends.

A part from literary activity, he did series of different private jobs also. So the cart of life can be driven. Also he continued his education privately. Till 1956 Qasim performed different jobs in Maktaba Jadid, Gosha e adab and Railway book stall (Publishing Companies), Humayun, (monthly literary magazine) Ujala and Qandeel (weekly social magazine) and Imroz and Nawa-i-Waqt (National Dailies). In mean time he finished his graduation.

In 1955, he was admitted into the Urdu Department of the University Oriental College to earn a master's degree. The Department head was Dr Syed Abdullah. But he couldn't complete his master's, due to his tight schedule. In 1956 Qasim decided that henceforth he would work only as a freelancer, away from government jobs which lock his weapon: his pen.

As mentioned above, Qasim Sahib was admirer of Urdu language. He had done Urdu translation of many English terms. He then wrote five Urdu books for students of political science and economics, including Asan Mashiat (Economic made easy), Mashiat kay Jadid Nazeray (New theories of Economics), Mubadi Mashiat (Basics of Economics) and Usool Siasiat (Basics of Political Science). All books were used in different Pakistani colleges for many years.

He also compiles general knowledge books. For Albian, the publishing house of noted intellectual Hanif Ramay, he wrote Cleopatra Kee Kahani (Life of Queen Cleopatra) and Sikander Azam Kee Kahani (Life of Alexander the Great). He also wrote Science Kia Haih (What is Science?) in easy language for general readers. In 1956, he worked as a sub-editor in fortnightly Sadiq (Truth). Its editor was acclaimed scholar and poet, Syed Abid Ali Abid.
In 1957 he got a job as assistant editor in Lailo-Nihar (Night and Day), a very famous social and literary magazine of those days. Famous poet Faiz Ahmed Faiz was editor-in-chief, and famed writer Syed Sibte Hassan was an editor. In coming months, Qasim edited famed Lailo-Nihar issue "So Sala Jang Azadi 1857 Number" (Hundred years of independence war, 1857 No.). His short stories were also published in magazine. But due to ideological differences, Qasim did not go along with his seniors.

Qasim started looking for a new job. After two months suddenly he was captivated by spiritual ecstasy. He then remained out of his senses for about one year. Qasim spent this time in a cell of Data Darbar, shrine of famous Sufi saint, Abul Hassan Ali Hajvery. When he got his senses, practical life once again started up. Qasim used to say "This is the finest year of my life."

In 1958, Qasim compiled the book Jansi Rasomat (Sexual customs). In it he describes sexual customs of ancient Greece, Rome, India, China, Japan, Indonesia, England, Pacific Islands. Punjab Govt banned this book, calling it obscene. And Qasim was book in a case. In court, many eminent Urdu writers testify that this book is a knowledgeable and scientific innovation. So Qasim was acquitted with honor.

In late 1958, he becomes assistant editor of bimonthly research journal, Sahifa (a book) which is edited by Abid Ali Abid. Then he opens his own publishing house, "Shish Mahal Kitab Ghar" (Glass Palace Book House). He wanted to publish science, technology, and literature books. Also to spread modern knowledge in Pakistan, he began publishing monthly Ilm (knowledge), which became popular in intellectual circles.

In 1958 Qasim also compiled Farhang Mashiat, the first dictionary of economics in Urdu. In 1959 he wrote a novella, Pundit Jalaluddin Nehru, about the Kashmir problem. In 1960 Qasim's first anthology of short stories Dewar Pather Kee (Wall of Stones) was published by Classics, a publishing firm of Lahore. The entire anthology stories deal with social, political and economic problem of Pakistani society.

In those days, the U.S. government wanted to promote American arts and culture in third world countries through his books, so she connected big American publishers, which liked this project. The U.S. government and big American publishers in collaboration started Franklin Book Program, a nonprofit publishing company. Branches were opened in Egypt, Iran and East and West Pakistan.

Its country head for West Pakistan was noted writer and intellectual, Maulana Hamid Ali Khan, brother of Maulana Zafar Ali Khan. Famous Pakistani writers i.e. Maulana Salahuddin Ahmed, Maulana Ghulam Rasool Mehr, Shahid Ahmed Dehlvi extra translated high-quality American books in Urdu. Qasim is also included in team of Franklin writers, and translated some scientific and sociological books.

Qasim saw that these very excellent books also goes to libraries of Govt institutions, schools and colleges and then remain locked up in cabinets. He gave a proposal to Maulana Hamid Ali Khan, that Franklin must publish paperback books also, so common people, particularly students can buy them. Maulana sahib said to Qasim "you can publish these paperbacks, we give you financial help." So then Qasim start publishing good American books in shape of paperbacks. In 1964 Shish Mahal Kitab Ghar was closed due to personal reasons. But after publishing 24 literary and scientific books, it becomes quite popular in country.

1961 To 1971
In 1963, Qasim's only novel, Chalay Din Bahar Kay (By gone days of spring) was published. The theme of novel is Pakistan's Society changing norms and moral values, due to modern material life coming from west. In 1964 Qasim become Editor in chief of Urdu's second Digest, Siara Digest. Due to his sound editorship and toil, Siara Digest becomes known social literacy and knowledgeable magazine.

In 1965 he joined the team of Urdu Encyclopedia as an editor. Well known publishing firm, Ferozsons was compiling and publishing this encyclopedia. Syed Sibte Hassan has edited articles of Urdu alphabet alif to ray, written by staff of Feroze sons. Now Qasim wrote articles of alphabets of seen to yay, and completed the encyclopedia. He also edited his articles. As a policy of Feroz Sons, they did not publish name of editor or writer in Urdu encyclopedia. So only Ferozsons's chairman, Dr A Wahid name was publish as Editor in chief.

In 1966, for some months, Qasim also edited eminent Urdu literary magazine Adab-e-Latif. He gave a new shape and style to magazine. Same year, second anthology of his short stories was published i.e. Qasim Kee Mendi (Qasim's Henna). (Here it is reference of Hazrat Al-Qasim bin Imam Hasan, who was martyred in Karbala).

In 1966, Franklin book program decided to compile and publish Urdu Jamia Encyclopedia. Its base was to be English language Columbia Encyclopedia. Now a board of editors was formed. Qasim is included in board. He worked with Justice S. A. Rahman, Prof. Hameed Ahmed Khan (V C, Punjab University), and famous Urdu writer, Maulana Ghulam Rasool Mehr. He participated in making of Index and wrote articles about History, Sociology and Anthropology. Urdu Jamia Encyclopedia was published in 1982 in two volumes.

In 1966, Pakistan Government agency for book promoting, National Book Council is looking a suitable person for his Lahore office as a head. Council's director general and legendary Urdu writer, Ibn-e-Insha want to give this job to Qasim Mahmood. But Qasim decline his offer because this is Govt job. When Insha Sahib Persistence Continue, at last he accept the job.

After becoming National Book Council's Lahore office Head, Qasim whole heartedly begin promoting book loving and development activities. He started monthly Kitab (Book) magazine. In it all articles are about new and old books and publishing activity. Then he started book fairs on very large scale in different parks. Public like these fairs and took part in large numbers. Qasim also started explanation or praising ceremonies of new books. This tendency becomes a trend setter and every writer or publisher begins to hold an explanatory ceremony of his new book.
In 1967 Qasim selected precious parts of Quaid e Azam Muhammad Ali Jinnah speeches and writings and then translated them into Urdu. This anthology of Pakistan founder saying was published in the name of Quaid-e-Azam ka pagam. It is first Urdu book of this kind and instantly become famous. National Urdu dailies regularly published Quaid's sayings from this book.

In 1969 Govt of Pakistan decided to write down Lahore (or Pakistan) and Delhi Resolutions on platform of Minar-e-Pakistan on, marble tablets, so new generation can remember them. These Resolutions had to write down on marble by Calligraphers in a beautiful way. Qasim Mahmood was selected as an editor of this valuable project. First Qasim translated English Resolution in Urdu, then he acquire world-famous calligraphers i.e. Hafiz Yousaf Sadidi, Iqbal Ibn-e-Parveen Raqam, Sufi Khursheed Alam, Muhammad Siddique Almas Raqam extra to do the job. Then under his watchful eyes, this nationally important work was completed smoothly. This project was headed by famous writer and Govt civil officer, Mukhtar Masood.

1971 to 1980
In early 1971, Qasim begin publishing fortnightly Khialat (Ideas). This magazine was reserved for scientific and fine arts. Same year he also started Maloomat (knowledge). biggest general Encyclopedia of Pakistan in installments. Unfortunately Indo-Pak war ruined his plans. Qasim has collected some money with toil to start Maloomat. During war no one interested to buy this Encyclopedia, so after publishing some installments, all the money was spent. He has to close down Maloomat and Khialat.

In December 1971 he again joins Siara Digest as an editor in chief. He worked there till December 1974. During this tenure, Qasim edited proclaimed numbers of Siara Digest i.e. Quran No and Rasool No (prophet Muhammad No).

In 1975 he founded his famous publishing company, Maktaba Shahkar (Classics books). From Maktaba shahkar Qasim execute some such experiments which are unique not in Pakistan but also in world. Undertaking first experiment, he published books in shape and size (23X36X8) of magazine. As a matter of fact, there are large size paperback books. Due to this innovation, Urdu literary & knowledge books become very cheap. Books prices came down almost 75 percent. For this reason, Shahkar books become very popular in Middle and lower classes. Thousands of poor Pakistani people buy Shahkar Jiridi (magazine) books and made their own library in home, and this is the dream of Qasim Mahmood.[4] He made every book so cheap that now everyone can buy easily. For this achievement he was praised by Swedish, Japanese, Filipino, Indian and Nepalese publishers and intellectuals.

Qasim also published some books in shape of Newspaper, Digest and Pocket size. Till 1980, Maktaba Shahkar published one hundred Twenty five literary and scientific books. Then due to various reasons, this revolutionary publishing house was closed. First of all, other publishers feel jealousy from Shahkar books. They also start publishing their own Jirdi books. This was their right, but they secretly planted their moles in Maktba Shahkar, so they can know which books are coming in next weeks. (Qasim published one new book every week).

In meantime Pakistan's political panorama become very hot. Riots take place and closure of all shops become norm. In 1977 General Ziaul Haq imprisons Prime Minister Zulfiqar Ali Bhutto and proclaimed martial law in country. Qasim had ideological differences with Bhutto, but he was also staunch foe of dictatorship. So he fought a very vigorous war with generals who have executed the democracy. He had no personal interest attach to his effort. That's why when Bhutto's daughter, Benazir Bhutto made mistakes during her premiership, Qasim boldly criticize her. He is a man of ideological principles.

In 1977, Qasim started the literary weekly magazine, 'Qafla (Caravan). He changed it into a political magazine and from his sword, i.e. pen initiate furious attack on Martial law Govt. Also from Maktaba Shahkar he published imperative political and intellectual book i.e. Murda Bhutto, Zanda Bhutto (Dead Bhutto, Alive Bhutto), Qual Bhutto (Sayings of Bhutto), Bhutto's biography, Bhutto Takhtadar per (Bhutto mount the Scafolled) extra. All books are written by noted writer and translator, Sattar Tahir.

Dictators of Pak Govt can't tolerate harsh critic of this kind. So Punjab governor, Lt Gen (r) Ghulam Jilani Khan send Qasim Mahmood this message "You have angered General Ziaul Haq. Now it's better for you to migrate Karachi and keep your mouth shut." This is a soft message; side by side he also received threats that his books business will be ruined. Due to the cunning tactics of dictators, miserable national conditions and other reasons, Maktaba Shahkar collapsed. Now Qasim is forced to migrate Karachi with his family. He migrates in state of helplessness for the second time in his life. When he arrived in Karachi, Qasim have some hundred rupees in pocket, but his heart was full of courage.

From 1976 to 1977, Qasim was one of the five members of Punjab Govt's Majlis-Zaban-i-Daftri. In this position he took part in compiling 500 pages dictionary of official terms (English to Urdu). Other members of the committee were Professor Mahmood Ahmed Khan, well known Poet, Sufi Ghulam Mustafa Tabassum, famous Urdu critic, Professor Waqar Azeem, Dr. Syed Abdulla and principle Govt College, Lahore, Dr. Nazir Ahmed.

1981 to 1990
After reaching Karachi, he edited known Urdu magazine, Alami Digest for some months. He also translates master pieces of international fiction for well known magazine i.e. Sabrang and Qaumi Digest. Then Qasim work as a deputy editor Nawa-i-Waqt, Karachi. But he wants to continue his book Promoting mission. So when he got senses back, Qasim open his publishing house in the new name of Shahkar Book Foundation. From this company he published 35 paperback books. Again they are very cheap, according to his lifelong mission, so poor people can also buy scientific and literary books.

In 1975, Qasim had start publishing Shahkar Islami Encyclopedia and Baby encyclopedia in installments, so poor also can buy. Due to shady circumstances, Urdu's first encyclopedia for children, Baby Encyclopedia can't be completed. But Islamic Encyclopedia completed in time and this was a huge accomplish. Islamic Encyclopedia was published in 1984, in one volume. This is biggest Encyclopedia of Islam in Urdu, after Punjab University's Da'ira Ma'arif-i-Islamiya.

In 1985, Qasim founded monthly Urdu magazine, Talib-e-Ilum (Student). At first it was literary and intellectual magazine. But soon it was named Science Magazine. Now this magazine was reserved to promote science & technology in Pakistan. Science magazine took active part through articles to educate masses about modern Scientific and technological developments. His pupil and ex editor of Science Magazine, Aleem Ahmed is also publishing now only truly Urdu scientific monthly magazine, Global Science (Urdu).

Science Magazine is the first Pakistani publication which published on its title, picture of country's only Nobel laureate, Dr. Abdul Salam. Because Dr. Abdul Salam was an Ahmadi Muslim, Pakistani media didn't give much attention to Dr. Salam. Qasim Mahmood also published many writings of Dr. Abdul Salam and a biography is also printed.

One day, Qasim received a message from some religious leaders, declaring Abdul Salam is non-Muslim, so refrain from him and his writings. Qasim Sahib answered "I only publish his scientific views. I have no concern about his faith. I believe whole heartedly on Khatim an-Nabuwwah, but I think, there is no evil to publish Dr. Abdul Salam articles, along with those of a Jew Albert Einstein and Christians Newton or Carl Sagan.

Due to finical constrains, which Qasim faced whole his life, he again forced to shut down Science Magazine in 1995. The Pakistan Govt and people, both are more interested in politics and sports, instead of science, Technology and literature. In 1985 he edits and then publishes Islamic Almanac. It was sequence of Islamic encyclopedia and contains new and modern knowledge about world of Islam.

In 1986 Qasim edited and publish Encyclopedia Falqiat (Encyclopedia of Astronomy) in installments. This was completed successfully in 1987. Then he edited and publishes Encyclopedia Ijadat (encyclopedia of Inventions). It was also publish in installments and completed in time.

Actually these encyclopedias are part of much bigger Encyclopedia Science. Related to this, Qasim also wrote three books i.e. Islamic Science, Muslim Science and Hamri Kianat (Our Universe). In these books we found information about History of Science in Islamic World, human Friendly works of Muslim Scientist and their biographies. Hamari Kianat is about Cosmology. Unfortunately for Pakistanis, due to unscientific atmosphere, Encyclopedia of Science can't be completed.

In 1988, Qasim started Afsana Digest, a monthly magazine reserved for short stories. Its editor was his son, Syed Asim Mahmood. Afsana digest published works of art of international and national fiction and become popular in literary circles. In 1988, Qasim also edited Pakistan Digest. This magazine is reserved for Pakistan history, culture, literature, fine arts extra.

In 1990, he started Pakistan Open University. Its aim was to give wide-ranging knowledge of Pakistan Studies to new Pakistani generation. Many young students join the Open University, receive literature about Pakistan Studies, give examination and got a certificate.

Also in 1990, Qasim created his prominent compiling work Ilm-e-Quran. It contains, side by side, Arabic Quran, English translation of Quran by Allama Abdullah Yusuf Ali, Urdu translation of Maulana Fateh Mohammed Jalandhari and explanation by different religious intellectuals. In 1995 Ilm-e-Quran was published for Indian Muslims in five languages i.e. Arabic, English, Urdu, Hindi and Guajarati.

1991 to 2000
In 1992, Qasim started a new monthly magazine Islami Digest. Writing related to Islamic history, civilization, culture, politics, fine arts, science extra was publish in this magazine. Also in 1992, he compiled two memorable books, Roha Al Quran (Soul of Quran) and Roha Al Hadis (Soul of Narrations of Prophet Muhammad). These books are selection of Quranic subjects and narrations and are popular in people.

Qasim set in motion work of another mile stone of his life Encyclopedia Pakistanica (Pakistani Encyclopedia) in 1995. This mammoth work was completed in 1997, but after quite agonizing time. Unfortunately, in late 1997, his right arm was paralyzed due to weakness. Qasim then pray to God, bestow health and strength to his arm, so he can complete Encyclopedia of Pakistan. God accepted his pray. Then Qasim's right arm become healthy and workable till death. Encyclopedia of Pakistan is first Urdu encyclopedia covering with detail, the History of Pakistan, Culture, Fine arts, Politics, Geography, people etc. It is included in the 100 best Urdu books at no 56.

In 1998 Qasim again migrated to Lahore, city of parks. Same year he begin working with Pakistan Academy of Letters as advisor of books. With finical help from Academy now he starts editing Pakistani Bachioan ka Encyclopedia (Encyclopedia for Pakistani Children). Also he plans to edit Encyclopedia Adabiyat (Encyclopedic of Literature). Unluckily when Nawaz Sharif Govt was ended by General Pervaiz Musharf, his plans were also abolished.

In 1999 Qasim begin editing and publishing Encyclopedia Tarikh Insaniat (Encyclopedia of Human Kind History). It was also published in installments. In this encyclopedia he wants describe humankind religious, political, economical, sociological, cultural, scientific, literary and technological history. But only 8 installments were published. He had to close this project due to adverse behavior of people; they have for science and knowledge.

2001 to 2010
In 2000 Qasim start writing and compiling Seerat al Nabi (S.A.W.W ) ka Encyclopedia . This work was completed in 2004. It was published in 2014 by Alfaisal Publishers. This Encyclopedia was completed in two volumes. In 2004 he becomes joint editor of weekly Ahyia Khilafah. In 2005, Qasim commence a new project, Encyclopedia Muslim India. In 2006 he becomes advisor of books in Iqbal Academy, Lahore. In 2007, third collection of Qasim's short stories Syed Qasim Mahmood kay Afsaney (Short stories of Qasim Mahmood) was published.

In 2008, as a translator, he translated in Urdu, Origin of Species, a masterpiece, written by Charles Darwin. In Urdu its name is Asal Anwaa. It was published by National Language Authority, Islamabad.

In 2009, Qasim start writing his last work, Encyclopedia of Quran. In this gigantic book, he wanted to insert everything related to Quran. Six installments of this encyclopedia were published, then he died. Also in 2009 he conceived an idea for children encyclopedia on the behalf of AFAQ (Association for Academic Quality). In September 2010, his idea becomes reality and Afaq Encyclopedia for children starts publishing in installments.

Death
Syed Qasim Mahmood was patient of Diabetes, Ulcer and diseases of heart and kidneys. In November 2009, suddenly he feels unwell and become constant companion of bed. He never recovered and in morning of 31 March 2010, he died peacefully.

Works

Short story anthologies, novels
Dewar Pather Kee (Wall of Stones).
Qasim Kee Mendi (Qasim's Henna).
Syed Qasim Mahmood kay Afsaney (Short stories of Qasim Mahmood).
Chalay Din Bahar Kay (By gone days of spring), Novel.
Pundit Jalaluddin Nehru, novelette.
Anokhi Kahaniyan.

Encyclopedias, edited and compiled
Seerat-Un-Nabi Encyclopedia.
Urdu Encyclopedia.
Urdu Jamia Encyclopedia.
Maloomat (knowledge) (General Encyclopedia).
Shahkar Islami Encyclopedia.
Baby encyclopedia.
Islamic Almanac.
Encyclopedia Falqiat (Encyclopedia of Astronomy).
Encyclopedia Ijadaat (encyclopedia of Inventions).
Encyclopedia Science.
Encyclopedia Pakistanica (Encyclopedia of a Pakistani).
Pakistani Bachioan ka Encyclopedia (Encyclopedia for Pakistani Children).
Encyclopedia Tarikh Insaniat (Encyclopedia of Human Kind History).
Seerat Encyclopedia.
Encyclopedia Muslim India.
Encyclopedia of Quran.

Edited magazines
Khwateen (women).
Ujala (dawn).
Qandeel (candle).
Sadiq (Truth).
Lailo-Nihar (Night and Day).
Sahifa (a book).
Siara Digest.
Adab-e-Latifv.
Kitabv (Book).
Khialat (Ideas).
Qafla (Caravan).
Alami Digest.
Talib-e-Ilum (Student).
Science Magazine.
Afsana Digest.
Pakistan Digest.
Islami Digest.
Ahyia Khilafah.
Ahiya-e-Uloom (Revival of Knowledge).

Books, written or compiled
Asan Mashiatv (Economic made easy).
Mashiat kay Jadid Nazeray (New theories of Economics).
Mubadi Mashiat (Basics of Economics).
Usool Siasiat (Basics of Political Science).
Cleopatra Kee Kahani (Life of Queen Cleopatra).
Sikander Azam Kee Kahani (Life of Alexander the great).
Sardar Abdur Rab Nishtar.
Science kia haih (What is Science).
Jansi Rasomat (Sexual customs).
Nawab Muhammad Ismaeel Khan.
Farhang Mashiat (dictionary of Economics).
Quaid-e-Azam ka Pagam (Quaid e Azam Muhammad Ali Jinnah speeches and writings).
Besiwian Sadi Aur Amriat (Twentieth Century and Dictatorship).
Islami Duniya 2012.
Ilm-e-Quran
Islami Science.
Roha Al Quran (Soul of Quran).
Roha Al Hadis (Soul of Narrations of Prophet Muhammad).
Paiyam-e-Romi.
Nawab Muhammad Ismail Khan (life and achievements of the well-known luminary of Pakistan Movement )
Piaam Iqbal Ba Nojwan Milliat (Message of Iqbal to new Generation).
Dr M Hamidullah Ki Behtreen Tehreerain.

Translations

Non-fiction
An introduction to contemporary knowledge, C. E. M. Joad.
Origin of Species, Charles Darwin.
Islam and Pakistan's Identity, Justice Javed Iqbal.
The Physiology of Sex, Kenneth Walker.
The Immense Journey, Loren Eiseley.
The Great Ascent, Robert L. Heilbroner.
Inventivity, Robert E. Mueller.
Patterns of Culture, Ruth Benedict.
What is a Classic? T. S. Eliot.

Novels
A Tale of Two Cities, Charles Dickens.
Sea of Grass, Conrad Richter.
Wuthering Heights, Emily Brontë.
The Gambler, Fyodor Dostoevsky.
Une vie, Guy de Maupassant.
Lust for Life, Irving Stone.
Bhowani Junction John Masters.
Captain Caution, Kenneth Roberts.
The Death of Ivan Ilyich, Leo Tolstoy.

Dramas
Tamburlaine, Christopher Marlowe.
A Doll's House, Ibsen.
Justice, John Galsworthy.
La Mort de Tintagiles, Maurice Maeterlinck.
Antony and Cleopatra, William Shakespeare.
Macbeth, William Shakespeare.
Othello, William Shakespeare.
Hamlet, William Shakespeare.
Romeo and Juliet, William Shakespeare.

Short stories
The Duel (Alexander Pushkin), The Bet, The Kiss (Anton Chekhov), The Shirts (Carl Capek), The Horse-Dealer's Daughter, The Prussian Officer (D. H. Lawrence), The Wide Net (Eudora Welty), A Christmas Tree and a Wedding, The Thief (Fyodor Dostoevsky), Dove and Jackal (Frank Brownlee), A Passion in the Desert (Honoré de Balzac)

References

1928 births
2010 deaths
Urdu-language writers from British India
Urdu-language short story writers
Urdu-language writers from Pakistan
20th-century Urdu-language writers
Urdu-language translators
People from Sonipat